James Albert Murray (July 5, 1932 – June 5, 2020) was an American prelate of the Roman Catholic Church. He served as bishop of the Diocese of Kalamazoo in Michigan from 1998 to 2009.

Biography

Early life 
James Murray was born in Jackson, Michigan to James Albert and Marcella Clare (née Harris) Murray.  He  has two older brothers, Joseph and William.  James Murray attended St. Mary's elementary and high schools in Jackson. In high school, he enjoyed boxing and baseball, and was elected senior class president.

After deciding to become a priest, Murray entered Sacred Heart Seminary in Detroit, obtaining a Bachelor of Arts.  Murray then attended St. John's Provincial Seminary in Plymouth, Michigan, earning his Bachelor of Sacred Theology degree.

Priesthood 
Murray was ordained to the priesthood for the Diocese of Lansing by Bishop Joseph Albers on June 7, 1958.  After his ordination, Murray was assigned as parochial vicar of St. Joseph Parish in St. Joseph, Michigan, serving there until 1961.  That year, he was transferred to be an assistant pastor at St. Mary Cathedral Parish.   

In 1962, Murray went to Washington, D.C. to attend the Catholic University of America School of Canon Law. He received a Licentiate of Canon Law there in 1964. After returning to Lansing, Murray was appointed assistant pastor of St. Therese Parish. He was transferred to St. Gerard Parish in Lansing in 1968.  In 1973, he was appointed rector of St. Mary Cathedral.

In 1968. Murray was appointed chancellor pf the diocese, a position he would hold until 1997.  He also served as moderator of the curia, tribunal judge, and ecumenical officer.  Murray served as chaplain of the Lansing Police Department and sat on several committees of the Michigan Catholic Conference. He was raised to the rank of honorary prelate of his holiness in 1993.

Bishop of Kalamazoo 
On November 18, 1997, Murray was appointed as the third bishop of the Diocese of Kalamazoo by Pope John Paul II. He received his episcopal consecration on January 27, 1998, from Cardinal Adam Maida, with Bishops Paul Donovan and Carl Mengeling serving as co-consecrators, in St. Augustine Cathedral in Kalamazoo. He selected as his episcopal motto: "Rejoice in the Lord always".

in 2006. Murray released the “Diocesan Pastoral Plan for Hispanic Latino Ministry.” He also established the diocese Trauma Recovery Program for victims of childhood trauma. Murray served as an advisor to the Michigan Catholic Conference (MCC) and wrote its program on assisted suicide education in 1993. Within the United States Conference of Catholic Bishops, Murray sat on the Ad Hoc Committee on Sexual Abuse.   Murray was a member of the committee for the American College of Louvain as well.

Retirement and legacy 
On reaching the mandatory retirement age of 75 for bishops in 2007, Murray submitted his letter of resignation to Pope Benedict XVI. His resignation was accepted on April 6, 2009.  He served as apostolic administrator of Kalamazoo until the installation of his successor, Bishop Paul J. Bradley, on June 6, 2009.

James Murray died in Kalamazoo on June 5, 2020 at the age of 87.

References

External links
Roman Catholic Diocese of Kalamazoo Official Site
Catholic-Hierarchy
Biography on Diocese of Kalamazoo site
USCCB Office of Media Relations 

1932 births
2020 deaths
Sacred Heart Major Seminary alumni
Catholic University of America alumni
People from Jackson, Michigan
20th-century Roman Catholic bishops in the United States
21st-century Roman Catholic bishops in the United States
Roman Catholic bishops of Kalamazoo
Catholic University of America School of Canon Law alumni